The Leyla-Tepe culture of the South Caucasus belongs to the Chalcolithic era. It got its name from the site in the Agdam district of modern day Azerbaijan. Its settlements were distributed on the southern slopes of Central Caucasus, from 4350 until 4000 B.C.

Monuments of the Leyla-Tepe were first located in the 1980s by I. G. Narimanov, a Soviet archaeologist. In the 2000s, attention to the monuments was inspired by the risk of their damage due to the construction of the Baku–Tbilisi–Ceyhan pipeline and the South Caucasus pipeline.

Characteristics and influences 

The Leyla-Tepe culture is also attested at Boyuk Kesik in the lower layers of this settlement. The inhabitants apparently buried their dead in ceramic vessels. Similar amphora burials in the South Caucasus are found in the Western Georgian Jar-Burial culture, that is mostly of a much later date.

The ancient Poylu II settlement was discovered in the Agstafa District of modern day Azerbaijan during the construction of the Baku-Tbilisi-Ceyhan pipeline. The lowermost layer dates to the early fourth millennium BC, attesting a multilayer settlement of Leyla-Tepe culture.

Among the sites associated with this culture, the Soyugbulag kurgans or barrows are of special importance. The excavation of these kurgans, located in Kaspi Municipality, in central Georgia, demonstrated an unexpectedly early date of such structures on the territory of Azerbaijan. They were dated to the beginning of the 4th millennium BC.

The culture has also been linked to the north Ubaid period monuments, in particular, with the settlements in the Eastern Anatolia Region (Arslantepe, Coruchu-tepe, Tepechik, etc.).

It has been suggested that the Leyla-Tepe were the founders of the Maykop culture.

An expedition to Syria by the Russian Academy of Sciences revealed the similarity of the Maykop and Leyla-Tepe artifacts with those found recently while excavating the ancient city of Tel Khazneh I, from the 4th millennium BC.

Leyla-Tepe pottery is very similar to the 'Chaff-Faced Ware' of the northern Syria and Mesopotamia. It is especially well attested at Amuq F phase. Similar pottery is also found at Kultepe, Azerbaijan.

Galayeri
In 2012, the important site of Galayeri, belonging to the Leyla-Tepe archaeological culture, was investigated. It is located in the Qabala District of modern day Azerbaijan. Galayeri is closely connected to early civilizations of Near East.

Structures consisting of clay layers are typical; no mud-brick walls have been detected at Galayeri. Almost all findings have Eastern Anatolian Chalcolithic characteristics. The closest analogues of the Galayeri clay constructions are found at Arslantepe/Melid VII in Temple C.

Metalwork
The appearance of Leyla-Tepe tradition's carriers in the Caucasus marked the appearance of the first local Caucasian metallurgy. This is perhaps, but not entirely, attributed to migrants from Uruk arriving around 4500 BCE.

Recent research indicates the connections rather to the pre-Uruk traditions, such as the late Ubaid period, and Ubaid-Uruk phases.

Leyla-Tepe metalwork tradition was very sophisticated right from the beginning and featured many bronze items. Later, the quality of metallurgy increased in both sophistication and quality with the advent of the Kura–Araxes culture .

See also
Kura–Araxes culture

References

Sources 
 Р. М. Мунчаев, Н. Я. Мерперт, Ш. Н. Амиров ТЕЛЛЬ-ХАЗНА I. Культово-административный центр IV–III тыс. до н. э. в Северо-восточной Сирии. Издательство «Палеограф». Москва 2004. 
Najaf Museyibly, Archeological Excavations Along the Route of the Baku–Tbilisi–Ceyhan Crude Oil Pipeline and the South Caucasus Gas Pipeline, 2002–2005

1980s archaeological discoveries
Archaeological cultures of the Caucasus
Archaeological cultures of West Asia
Chalcolithic cultures of Asia
Archaeological cultures in Georgia (country)